Buisset is a surname. Notable people with the surname include:

Séraphin Buisset (1870–1949), French politician
Jean-Marie Buisset (1938–2010), Belgian field-hockey player and bobsledder